This is a partial list of unnumbered minor planets for principal provisional designations assigned between 1 January and 31 December 1997. , a total of 186 bodies remain unnumbered for this period. Also see previous and next year.

A 

|- id="1997 AC11" bgcolor=#FFC2E0
| 3 ||  || ATE || 20.5 || data-sort-value="0.28" | 280 m || multiple || 1997–2017 || 28 Dec 2017 || 148 || align=left | Disc.: NEAT/GEODSS || 
|- id="1997 AF12" bgcolor=#E9E9E9
| 0 ||  || MBA-M || 17.18 || 1.5 km || multiple || 1997–2022 || 25 Jan 2022 || 184 || align=left | Disc.: SpacewatchAdded on 22 July 2020Alt.: 2015 MS33, 2017 YW15 || 
|- id="1997 AB15" bgcolor=#FA8072
| 0 ||  || MCA || 17.80 || data-sort-value="0.82" | 820 m || multiple || 1997–2022 || 26 Jan 2022 || 155 || align=left | Disc.: NEAT/GEODSS || 
|- id="1997 AD23" bgcolor=#d6d6d6
| – ||  || MBA-O || 17.5 || 1.8 km || single || 2 days || 13 Jan 1997 || 5 || align=left | Disc.: Mauna Kea Obs. || 
|- id="1997 AT24" bgcolor=#d6d6d6
| E ||  || MBA-O || 16.0 || 3.5 km || single || 5 days || 10 Jan 1997 || 6 || align=left | Disc.: Cerro Tololo || 
|- id="1997 AU24" bgcolor=#d6d6d6
| E ||  || MBA-O || 13.5 || 11 km || single || 5 days || 10 Jan 1997 || 6 || align=left | Disc.: Cerro Tololo || 
|}
back to top

C 

|- id="1997 CH" bgcolor=#fefefe
| 0 || 1997 CH || MBA-I || 17.92 || data-sort-value="0.77" | 770 m || multiple || 1997–2021 || 03 Oct 2021 || 106 || align=left | Disc.: SpacewatchAdded on 22 July 2020Alt.: 2016 CU208 || 
|- id="1997 CW3" bgcolor=#E9E9E9
| 0 ||  || MBA-M || 17.45 || data-sort-value="0.98" | 980 m || multiple || 1997–2022 || 26 May 2022 || 150 || align=left | Disc.: Spacewatch || 
|- id="1997 CD14" bgcolor=#d6d6d6
| 0 ||  || MBA-O || 16.50 || 2.8 km || multiple || 1997–2021 || 28 Nov 2021 || 171 || align=left | Disc.: Spacewatch || 
|- id="1997 CD17" bgcolor=#FFC2E0
| 6 ||  || APO || 27.5 || data-sort-value="0.011" | 11 m || single || 2 days || 11 Feb 1997 || 21 || align=left | Disc.: Spacewatch || 
|- id="1997 CJ24" bgcolor=#fefefe
| 0 ||  || MBA-I || 18.46 || data-sort-value="0.60" | 600 m || multiple || 1997–2021 || 30 Sep 2021 || 72 || align=left | Disc.: Spacewatch || 
|- id="1997 CW29" bgcolor=#C2E0FF
| E ||  || TNO || 6.5 || 237 km || single || 27 days || 07 Mar 1997 || 11 || align=left | Disc.: Mauna Kea Obs.LoUTNOs, plutino? || 
|- id="1997 CB31" bgcolor=#d6d6d6
| 0 ||  || MBA-O || 16.7 || 2.5 km || multiple || 1997–2019 || 08 Feb 2019 || 95 || align=left | Disc.: Spacewatch || 
|- id="1997 CC31" bgcolor=#E9E9E9
| 0 ||  || MBA-M || 16.71 || 2.5 km || multiple || 1997–2022 || 24 Nov 2022 || 176 || align=left | Disc.: Spacewatch || 
|}
back to top

E 

|- id="1997 EM1" bgcolor=#fefefe
| 0 ||  || MBA-I || 17.97 || data-sort-value="0.76" | 760 m || multiple || 1997–2021 || 10 Sep 2021 || 110 || align=left | Disc.: SpacewatchAlt.: 2003 WF164, 2014 WS146 || 
|- id="1997 EF5" bgcolor=#E9E9E9
| 0 ||  || MBA-M || 17.3 || 1.9 km || multiple || 1997–2020 || 29 Apr 2020 || 75 || align=left | Disc.: SpacewatchAlt.: 2010 EC59 || 
|- id="1997 EN6" bgcolor=#fefefe
| 0 ||  || MBA-I || 18.48 || data-sort-value="0.60" | 600 m || multiple || 1997–2021 || 28 Oct 2021 || 100 || align=left | Disc.: SpacewatchAdded on 22 July 2020Alt.: 2014 OR110 || 
|- id="1997 EF10" bgcolor=#E9E9E9
| 1 ||  || MBA-M || 19.83 || data-sort-value="0.51" | 370 m || multiple || 1997-2019 || 09 Apar 2019 || 36 || align=left | Disc.: SpacewatchAlt.: 2010 GX48, 2019 GG150 || 
|- id="1997 EJ10" bgcolor=#d6d6d6
| 0 ||  || MBA-O || 16.47 || 2.8 km || multiple || 1997–2021 || 08 Aug 2021 || 165 || align=left | Disc.: Spacewatch || 
|- id="1997 ER12" bgcolor=#fefefe
| 1 ||  || MBA-I || 18.6 || data-sort-value="0.57" | 570 m || multiple || 1997–2020 || 24 Jun 2020 || 43 || align=left | Disc.: SpacewatchAdded on 22 July 2020Alt.: 2020 JO11 || 
|- id="1997 EL15" bgcolor=#E9E9E9
| 1 ||  || MBA-M || 18.54 || data-sort-value="0.88" | 880 m || multiple || 1997–2023 || 17 Mar 2023 || 28 || align=left | Disc.: Spacewatch || 
|- id="1997 EH17" bgcolor=#d6d6d6
| 0 ||  || MBA-O || 17.0 || 2.2 km || multiple || 1997–2020 || 21 May 2020 || 33 || align=left | Disc.: Spacewatch || 
|- id="1997 EP21" bgcolor=#d6d6d6
| 0 ||  || MBA-O || 17.1 || 2.1 km || multiple || 1997–2020 || 15 May 2020 || 57 || align=left | Disc.: Spacewatch || 
|- id="1997 EV22" bgcolor=#E9E9E9
| 2 ||  || MBA-M || 18.22 || 1.1 km || multiple || 1997–2022 || 26 Nov 2022 || 27 || align=left | Disc.: Spacewatch || 
|- id="1997 EN23" bgcolor=#FFC2E0
| 6 ||  || AMO || 22.8 || data-sort-value="0.098" | 98 m || single || 21 days || 29 Mar 1997 || 17 || align=left | Disc.: Spacewatch || 
|- id="1997 EB25" bgcolor=#E9E9E9
| 0 ||  || MBA-M || 17.3 || 1.9 km || multiple || 1997–2020 || 23 Jan 2020 || 58 || align=left | Disc.: Spacewatch || 
|- id="1997 EG60" bgcolor=#E9E9E9
| 0 ||  || MBA-M || 17.36 || 1.4 km || multiple || 1997–2022 || 25 Jan 2022 || 90 || align=left | Disc.: SpacewatchAlt.: 2015 MV52 || 
|- id="1997 EJ60" bgcolor=#d6d6d6
| 0 ||  || MBA-O || 16.10 || 3.4 km || multiple || 1997–2022 || 25 Jan 2022 || 216 || align=left | Disc.: Spacewatch || 
|- id="1997 EK60" bgcolor=#d6d6d6
| 0 ||  || MBA-O || 16.58 || 2.7 km || multiple || 1997–2020 || 25 May 2020 || 155 || align=left | Disc.: Spacewatch || 
|- id="1997 EL60" bgcolor=#fefefe
| 0 ||  || MBA-I || 18.10 || data-sort-value="0.71" | 710 m || multiple || 1997–2021 || 08 Sep 2021 || 95 || align=left | Disc.: Spacewatch || 
|}
back to top

G 

|- id="1997 GB2" bgcolor=#d6d6d6
| 1 ||  || MBA-O || 18.7 || 1.0 km || multiple || 1997–2023 || 18 Mar 2023 || 99 || align=left | Disc.: Spacewatch || 
|- id="1997 GH2" bgcolor=#E9E9E9
| 0 ||  || MBA-M || 17.0 || 1.2 km || multiple || 1997–2020 || 11 Nov 2020 || 101 || align=left | Disc.: SpacewatchAlt.: 2008 YR31, 2016 WQ20 || 
|- id="1997 GJ2" bgcolor=#E9E9E9
| 0 ||  || MBA-M || 17.5 || 1.3 km || multiple || 1997–2020 || 21 Oct 2020 || 121 || align=left | Disc.: SpacewatchAdded on 22 July 2020 || 
|- id="1997 GF3" bgcolor=#d6d6d6
| 1 ||  || MBA-O || 17.0 || 2.2 km || multiple || 1997–2019 || 24 Aug 2019 || 88 || align=left | Disc.: NEAT/GEODSS || 
|- id="1997 GK3" bgcolor=#FFC2E0
| 2 ||  || APO || 22.8 || data-sort-value="0.098" | 98 m || multiple || 1997–2014 || 02 May 2014 || 64 || align=left | Disc.: SpacewatchAMO at MPC || 
|- id="1997 GU24" bgcolor=#fefefe
| 0 ||  || MBA-I || 18.12 || data-sort-value="0.71" | 710 m || multiple || 1997–2021 || 30 Jun 2021 || 122 || align=left | Disc.: SpacewatchAlt.: 2005 UK453 || 
|- id="1997 GQ25" bgcolor=#FA8072
| 0 ||  || MCA || 18.36 || data-sort-value="0.63" | 630 m || multiple || 1997–2021 || 30 Apr 2021 || 43 || align=left | Disc.: SpacewatchAlt.: 2009 FQ29 || 
|- id="1997 GZ26" bgcolor=#d6d6d6
| 0 ||  || MBA-O || 16.92 || 2.3 km || multiple || 1997–2020 || 14 Oct 2020 || 98 || align=left | Disc.: Spacewatch || 
|- id="1997 GL27" bgcolor=#E9E9E9
| 0 ||  || MBA-M || 18.01 || 1.1 km || multiple || 1997–2020 || 18 Sep 2020 || 80 || align=left | Disc.: Spacewatch || 
|- id="1997 GX27" bgcolor=#FA8072
| 2 ||  || MCA || 18.0 || data-sort-value="0.75" | 750 m || multiple || 1997–2021 || 06 Jan 2021 || 80 || align=left | Disc.: Whipple Obs. || 
|- id="1997 GK28" bgcolor=#E9E9E9
| 0 ||  || MBA-M || 18.02 || 1.1 km || multiple || 1997–2022 || 07 Apr 2022 || 78 || align=left | Disc.: Spacewatch || 
|- id="1997 GD32" bgcolor=#FFC2E0
| 6 ||  || APO || 21.5 || data-sort-value="0.18" | 180 m || single || 22 days || 06 May 1997 || 90 || align=left | Disc.: SpacewatchPotentially hazardous object || 
|- id="1997 GA45" bgcolor=#C2E0FF
| 2 ||  || TNO || 8.6 || 98 km || multiple || 1997–2017 || 24 Jun 2017 || 38 || align=left | Disc.: Mauna Kea Obs.LoUTNOs, cubewano (hot)Alt.: 2001 FH193 || 
|}
back to top

H 

|- id="1997 HM1" bgcolor=#fefefe
| 0 ||  || MBA-I || 17.89 || data-sort-value="0.79" | 790 m || multiple || 1997–2021 || 13 Jul 2021 || 102 || align=left | Disc.: SpacewatchAlt.: 2005 JB76 || 
|- id="1997 HB4" bgcolor=#E9E9E9
| 4 ||  || MBA-M || 18.2 || data-sort-value="0.96" | 960 m || multiple || 1997–2010 || 05 May 2010 || 16 || align=left | Disc.: SpacewatchAlt.: 2010 HY81 || 
|- id="1997 HM18" bgcolor=#fefefe
| 0 ||  || MBA-I || 17.6 || data-sort-value="0.90" | 900 m || multiple || 1997–2021 || 03 Jan 2021 || 120 || align=left | Disc.: Spacewatch || 
|}
back to top

J 

|- id="1997 JX2" bgcolor=#d6d6d6
| 0 ||  = (619161) || MBA-O || 16.33 || 3.0 km || multiple || 1997–2021 || 05 Nov 2021 || 167 || align=left | Disc.: Mauna Kea Obs. || 
|- id="1997 JS3" bgcolor=#d6d6d6
| 0 ||  || MBA-O || 17.42 || 1.8 km || multiple || 1997–2021 || 28 Nov 2021 || 54 || align=left | Disc.: Mauna Kea Obs.Alt.: 2010 RA100 || 
|- id="1997 JP5" bgcolor=#fefefe
| 0 ||  || MBA-I || 17.45 || data-sort-value="0.96" | 960 m || multiple || 1997–2020 || 15 Dec 2020 || 117 || align=left | Disc.: Spacewatch || 
|- id="1997 JN6" bgcolor=#fefefe
| 0 ||  || MBA-I || 17.80 || data-sort-value="0.82" | 820 m || multiple || 1997–2021 || 09 Nov 2021 || 183 || align=left | Disc.: Spacewatch || 
|- id="1997 JN19" bgcolor=#d6d6d6
| 0 ||  || MBA-O || 15.97 || 3.6 km || multiple || 1997–2021 || 09 Sep 2021 || 179 || align=left | Disc.: Spacewatch || 
|- id="1997 JO19" bgcolor=#E9E9E9
| 0 ||  || MBA-M || 17.7 || 1.6 km || multiple || 1997–2020 || 05 Nov 2020 || 76 || align=left | Disc.: Spacewatch || 
|- id="1997 JP19" bgcolor=#E9E9E9
| 0 ||  || MBA-M || 17.94 || data-sort-value="0.77" | 770 m || multiple || 1997–2021 || 10 May 2021 || 77 || align=left | Disc.: SpacewatchAdded on 11 May 2021 || 
|}
back to top

K 

|- id="1997 KP" bgcolor=#E9E9E9
| 0 || 1997 KP || MBA-M || 17.27 || 2.0 km || multiple || 1997–2021 || 26 Nov 2021 || 103 || align=left | Disc.: Whipple Obs. || 
|- id="1997 KZ2" bgcolor=#d6d6d6
| 0 ||  || MBA-O || 15.91 || 3.7 km || multiple || 1997–2021 || 11 Nov 2021 || 161 || align=left | Disc.: Spacewatch || 
|- id="1997 KP4" bgcolor=#fefefe
| 0 ||  || MBA-I || 18.16 || data-sort-value="0.69" | 690 m || multiple || 1997–2022 || 26 Jan 2022 || 135 || align=left | Disc.: DB MissingAdded on 22 July 2020 || 
|}
back to top

L 

|- id="1997 LA1" bgcolor=#fefefe
| 0 ||  || MBA-I || 18.58 || data-sort-value="0.62" | 620 m || multiple || 1997–2022 || 22 Sep 2022 || 99 || align=left | Disc.: Spacewatch || 
|- id="1997 LF3" bgcolor=#fefefe
| 0 ||  || MBA-I || 18.7 || data-sort-value="0.54" | 540 m || multiple || 1997–2021 || 15 May 2021 || 177 || align=left | Disc.: SpacewatchAdded on 11 May 2021Alt.: 2021 GD51 || 
|}
back to top

M 

|- id="1997 MN" bgcolor=#d6d6d6
| 0 || 1997 MN || MBA-O || 15.63 || 4.2 km || multiple || 1997–2022 || 05 Jan 2022 || 162 || align=left | Disc.: SpacewatchAdded on 22 July 2020Alt.: 2012 BS143 || 
|- id="1997 MS" bgcolor=#FFC2E0
| 7 || 1997 MS || APO || 19.1 || data-sort-value="0.54" | 540 m || single || 17 days || 12 Jul 1997 || 46 || align=left | Disc.: LINEAR || 
|- id="1997 MD10" bgcolor=#C7FF8F
| 1 ||  || CEN || 16.0 || 4.0 km || single || 137 days || 13 Nov 1997 || 115 || align=left | Disc.: LINEARMCA at MPC || 
|- id="1997 MM12" bgcolor=#d6d6d6
| 0 ||  || MBA-O || 17.4 || 1.8 km || multiple || 1997–2019 || 20 Dec 2019 || 50 || align=left | Disc.: DB MissingAdded on 22 July 2020 || 
|}
back to top

N 

|- id="1997 NT3" bgcolor=#E9E9E9
| 0 ||  || MBA-M || 17.81 || data-sort-value="0.81" | 810 m || multiple || 1997–2021 || 24 Oct 2021 || 121 || align=left | Disc.: SpacewatchAdded on 22 July 2020 || 
|- id="1997 NN4" bgcolor=#FA8072
| 2 ||  || MCA || 21.41 || data-sort-value="0.16" | 160 m || multiple || 1997–2016 || 30 Aug 2016 || 37 || align=left | Disc.: Spacewatch || 
|- id="1997 NR5" bgcolor=#fefefe
| 0 ||  || MBA-I || 19.0 || data-sort-value="0.47" | 470 m || multiple || 1997–2020 || 27 Apr 2020 || 30 || align=left | Disc.: Spacewatch || 
|- id="1997 NF6" bgcolor=#fefefe
| 0 ||  || MBA-I || 18.4 || data-sort-value="0.62" | 620 m || multiple || 1997–2020 || 04 Dec 2020 || 54 || align=left | Disc.: SpacewatchAdded on 17 January 2021 || 
|- id="1997 NP9" bgcolor=#fefefe
| 0 ||  || MBA-I || 19.61 || data-sort-value="0.36" | 360 m || multiple || 1997–2021 || 13 Oct 2021 || 35 || align=left | Disc.: SpacewatchAdded on 5 November 2021Alt.: 2014 OG7 || 
|- id="1997 NW9" bgcolor=#E9E9E9
| 0 ||  || MBA-M || 17.75 || data-sort-value="0.84" | 840 m || multiple || 1997–2021 || 05 Jul 2021 || 76 || align=left | Disc.: Spacewatch || 
|- id="1997 NP10" bgcolor=#FA8072
| 0 ||  || MCA || 20.36 || data-sort-value="0.25" | 250 m || multiple || 1997–2021 || 14 Nov 2021 || 98 || align=left | Disc.: SpacewatchAlt.: 2021 RZ101 || 
|- id="1997 ND12" bgcolor=#d6d6d6
| 0 ||  || MBA-O || 15.96 || 3.6 km || multiple || 1997–2021 || 07 Nov 2021 || 148 || align=left | Disc.: Spacewatch || 
|- id="1997 NE12" bgcolor=#fefefe
| 1 ||  || MBA-I || 18.93 || data-sort-value="0.49" | 490 m || multiple || 1997–2018 || 17 Nov 2018 || 49 || align=left | Disc.: SpacewatchAlt.: 2018 RM47 || 
|}
back to top

O 

|- id="1997 OH" bgcolor=#FA8072
| – || 1997 OH || MCA || 19.0 || data-sort-value="0.47" | 470 m || single || 4 days || 30 Jul 1997 || 31 || align=left | Disc.: ODAS || 
|- id="1997 OJ3" bgcolor=#E9E9E9
| 0 ||  || MBA-M || 18.47 || data-sort-value="0.60" | 600 m || multiple || 1997–2021 || 18 Jul 2021 || 44 || align=left | Disc.: Spacewatch || 
|}
back to top

P 

|- id="1997 PN" bgcolor=#FFC2E0
| 2 || 1997 PN || AMO || 19.7 || data-sort-value="0.41" | 410 m || multiple || 1997–2007 || 16 Aug 2007 || 127 || align=left | Disc.: NEAT/GEODSS || 
|- id="1997 PG4" bgcolor=#E9E9E9
| 0 ||  || MBA-M || 18.0 || 1.1 km || multiple || 1997–2019 || 16 Dec 2019 || 117 || align=left | Disc.: Spacewatch || 
|- id="1997 PQ6" bgcolor=#E9E9E9
| 0 ||  || MBA-M || 16.74 || 2.5 km || multiple || 1997–2022 || 25 Jan 2022 || 132 || align=left | Disc.: Spacewatch || 
|- id="1997 PR6" bgcolor=#fefefe
| 0 ||  || MBA-I || 18.24 || data-sort-value="0.67" | 670 m || multiple || 1997–2021 || 08 Jul 2021 || 83 || align=left | Disc.: Spacewatch || 
|}
back to top

Q 

|- id="1997 QK1" bgcolor=#FFC2E0
| 0 ||  || APO || 20.08 || data-sort-value="0.34" | 340 m || multiple || 1997–2011 || 09 Oct 2011 || 180 || align=left | Disc.: Mauna Kea Obs.Potentially hazardous object || 
|- id="1997 QH4" bgcolor=#C2E0FF
| 2 ||  || TNO || 7.0 || 204 km || multiple || 1997–2014 || 27 Sep 2014 || 30 || align=left | Disc.: Mauna Kea Obs.LoUTNOs, cubewano (hot), BR-mag: 1.68; taxonomy: RR || 
|}
back to top

R 

|- id="1997 RT" bgcolor=#FFC2E0
| 1 || 1997 RT || AMO || 19.8 || data-sort-value="0.39" | 390 m || multiple || 1997–2007 || 12 Jun 2007 || 310 || align=left | Disc.: Ondřejov Obs. || 
|- id="1997 RO1" bgcolor=#FA8072
| 0 ||  || MCA || 17.79 || data-sort-value="0.82" | 820 m || multiple || 1997–2020 || 14 Dec 2020 || 123 || align=left | Disc.: Ondřejov Obs.Alt.: 2012 RV6 || 
|- id="1997 RY6" bgcolor=#C2E0FF
| E ||  || TNO || 7.5 || 162 km || single || 52 days || 29 Oct 1997 || 20 || align=left | Disc.: La Palma Obs.LoUTNOs, cubewano (hot) || 
|- id="1997 RN7" bgcolor=#FA8072
| 0 ||  || MCA || 17.7 || 1.2 km || multiple || 1997–2020 || 23 Mar 2020 || 107 || align=left | Disc.: NRCAlt.: 1997 RL10, 2014 QQ419 || 
|- id="1997 RX9" bgcolor=#C2E0FF
| 5 ||  || TNO || 8.3 || 91 km || multiple || 1997–2000 || 08 Aug 2000 || 22 || align=left | Disc.: Palomar Obs.LoUTNOs, other TNO || 
|- id="1997 RC12" bgcolor=#E9E9E9
| 0 ||  || MBA-M || 18.3 || data-sort-value="0.92" | 920 m || multiple || 1997–2019 || 02 Oct 2019 || 43 || align=left | Disc.: ODASAdded on 22 July 2020 || 
|- id="1997 RL13" bgcolor=#C2E0FF
| E ||  || TNO || 9.5 || 43 km || single || 1 day || 06 Sep 1997 || 4 || align=left | Disc.: Palomar Obs.LoUTNOs, cubewano? || 
|}
back to top

S 

|- id="1997 SU3" bgcolor=#fefefe
| 0 ||  || MBA-I || 18.7 || data-sort-value="0.54" | 540 m || multiple || 1997–2020 || 02 Feb 2020 || 41 || align=left | Disc.: Spacewatch || 
|- id="1997 SX5" bgcolor=#fefefe
| 0 ||  || MBA-I || 18.65 || data-sort-value="0.55" | 550 m || multiple || 1997–2021 || 08 Nov 2021 || 97 || align=left | Disc.: SpacewatchAlt.: 2014 RE20 || 
|- id="1997 SX6" bgcolor=#d6d6d6
| 0 ||  || MBA-O || 16.8 || 2.4 km || multiple || 1997–2019 || 04 Oct 2019 || 82 || align=left | Disc.: SpacewatchAlt.: 2014 UG3 || 
|- id="1997 SK7" bgcolor=#d6d6d6
| 0 ||  || MBA-O || 17.1 || 2.2 km || multiple || 1997–2021 || 07 Jan 2021 || 108 || align=left | Disc.: SpacewatchAlt.: 2010 ED152 || 
|- id="1997 ST7" bgcolor=#d6d6d6
| 0 ||  || MBA-O || 17.3 || 1.9 km || multiple || 1997–2020 || 15 Oct 2020 || 49 || align=left | Disc.: SpacewatchAdded on 17 January 2021 || 
|- id="1997 SV7" bgcolor=#fefefe
| 0 ||  || MBA-I || 18.29 || data-sort-value="0.65" | 650 m || multiple || 1997–2021 || 27 Sep 2021 || 81 || align=left | Disc.: SpacewatchAlt.: 2014 OR217 || 
|- id="1997 SY8" bgcolor=#fefefe
| 0 ||  || MBA-I || 18.8 || data-sort-value="0.52" | 520 m || multiple || 1997–2020 || 27 Jan 2020 || 30 || align=left | Disc.: Spacewatch || 
|- id="1997 SB9" bgcolor=#E9E9E9
| 1 ||  || MBA-M || 17.5 || 1.3 km || multiple || 1997–2019 || 17 Dec 2019 || 58 || align=left | Disc.: Spacewatch || 
|- id="1997 SS9" bgcolor=#fefefe
| 0 ||  || MBA-I || 18.21 || data-sort-value="0.68" | 680 m || multiple || 1997–2022 || 25 Jan 2022 || 93 || align=left | Disc.: SpacewatchAlt.: 2011 DF16 || 
|- id="1997 ST11" bgcolor=#fefefe
| 0 ||  || MBA-I || 18.5 || data-sort-value="0.59" | 590 m || multiple || 1997–2020 || 11 Dec 2020 || 32 || align=left | Disc.: SpacewatchAdded on 22 July 2020Alt.: 2013 NM47 || 
|- id="1997 SW11" bgcolor=#fefefe
| 0 ||  || MBA-I || 18.04 || data-sort-value="0.73" | 730 m || multiple || 1997–2021 || 05 Jan 2021 || 106 || align=left | Disc.: Spacewatch || 
|- id="1997 SY11" bgcolor=#E9E9E9
| – ||  || MBA-M || 19.3 || data-sort-value="0.41" | 410 m || single || 7 days || 04 Oct 1997 || 8 || align=left | Disc.: Spacewatch || 
|- id="1997 SA12" bgcolor=#d6d6d6
| 0 ||  || HIL || 15.81 || 3.8 km || multiple || 1997–2021 || 09 Dec 2021 || 103 || align=left | Disc.: SpacewatchAlt.: 1997 TD30, 2012 QP67 || 
|- id="1997 SB12" bgcolor=#fefefe
| 1 ||  || MBA-I || 19.82 || data-sort-value="0.32" | 320 m || multiple || 1997–2021 || 30 Nov 2021 || 41 || align=left | Disc.: SpacewatchAlt.: 2014 UG164 || 
|- id="1997 SY12" bgcolor=#d6d6d6
| 0 ||  || MBA-O || 17.5 || 1.8 km || multiple || 1997–2018 || 05 Oct 2018 || 50 || align=left | Disc.: SpacewatchAlt.: 2013 TJ140 || 
|- id="1997 SM13" bgcolor=#fefefe
| 1 ||  || MBA-I || 18.3 || data-sort-value="0.65" | 650 m || multiple || 1997–2020 || 06 Dec 2020 || 101 || align=left | Disc.: Spacewatch || 
|- id="1997 SS14" bgcolor=#d6d6d6
| 0 ||  = (619162) || MBA-O || 17.0 || 2.2 km || multiple || 1997–2021 || 08 Jun 2021 || 73 || align=left | Disc.: Spacewatch || 
|- id="1997 SW14" bgcolor=#fefefe
| 0 ||  || MBA-I || 18.93 || data-sort-value="0.52" | 520 m || multiple || 1997–2022 || 19 Nov 2022 || 93 || align=left | Disc.: SpacewatchAlt.: 2015 WZ5 || 
|- id="1997 SU16" bgcolor=#d6d6d6
| 0 ||  || MBA-O || 17.2 || 2.0 km || multiple || 1997–2021 || 05 Jun 2021 || 71 || align=left | Disc.: Spacewatch || 
|- id="1997 SX16" bgcolor=#E9E9E9
| 0 ||  || MBA-M || 19.2 || data-sort-value="0.43" | 430 m || multiple || 1997–2022 || 14 Sep 2022 || 55 || align=left | Disc.: SpacewatchAlt.: 2018 VR92 || 
|- id="1997 SB17" bgcolor=#E9E9E9
| 0 ||  || MBA-M || 17.81 || data-sort-value="0.81" | 810 m || multiple || 1997–2021 || 11 Sep 2021 || 52 || align=left | Disc.: Mauna Kea Obs. || 
|- id="1997 SC19" bgcolor=#E9E9E9
| 0 ||  || MBA-M || 17.46 || 1.4 km || multiple || 1997–2021 || 03 May 2021 || 98 || align=left | Disc.: SpacewatchAlt.: 2010 UK45 || 
|- id="1997 SS19" bgcolor=#E9E9E9
| – ||  || MBA-M || 18.8 || data-sort-value="0.52" | 520 m || single || 12 days || 10 Oct 1997 || 9 || align=left | Disc.: Spacewatch || 
|- id="1997 ST19" bgcolor=#fefefe
| 0 ||  || MBA-I || 18.47 || data-sort-value="0.60" | 600 m || multiple || 1993–2020 || 05 Nov 2020 || 83 || align=left | Disc.: SpacewatchAlt.: 1993 QF11 || 
|- id="1997 SE20" bgcolor=#fefefe
| 0 ||  || MBA-I || 17.88 || data-sort-value="0.79" | 790 m || multiple || 1997–2021 || 02 Dec 2021 || 204 || align=left | Disc.: SpacewatchAlt.: 2007 RW6 || 
|- id="1997 SK20" bgcolor=#d6d6d6
| 3 ||  || MBA-O || 18.1 || 1.3 km || multiple || 1997–2018 || 17 Aug 2018 || 31 || align=left | Disc.: SpacewatchAdded on 11 May 2021Alt.: 2013 TB128 || 
|- id="1997 SR22" bgcolor=#d6d6d6
| 0 ||  || MBA-O || 17.2 || 2.0 km || multiple || 1997–2022 || 29 Apr 2022 || 46 || align=left | Disc.: SpacewatchAdded on 17 June 2021Alt.: 2008 WU158 || 
|- id="1997 SY22" bgcolor=#fefefe
| 0 ||  || MBA-I || 17.7 || data-sort-value="0.86" | 860 m || multiple || 1997–2020 || 24 Dec 2020 || 138 || align=left | Disc.: SpacewatchAlt.: 2004 PW22, 2015 TN1 || 
|- id="1997 SD23" bgcolor=#fefefe
| 0 ||  || MBA-I || 18.4 || data-sort-value="0.62" | 620 m || multiple || 1997–2020 || 07 Dec 2020 || 96 || align=left | Disc.: SpacewatchAlt.: 2016 SP45 || 
|- id="1997 SC26" bgcolor=#E9E9E9
| 2 ||  || MBA-M || 18.93 || data-sort-value="0.70" | 700 m || multiple || 1997-2022 || 02 Oct 2022 || 35 || align=left | Disc.: Spacewatch || 
|- id="1997 SF26" bgcolor=#d6d6d6
| 0 ||  || MBA-O || 16.77 || 2.5 km || multiple || 1997–2021 || 10 Oct 2021 || 116 || align=left | Disc.: SpacewatchAlt.: 2013 RC1 || 
|- id="1997 SJ26" bgcolor=#E9E9E9
| 0 ||  || MBA-M || 17.5 || 1.3 km || multiple || 1997–2020 || 09 Dec 2020 || 185 || align=left | Disc.: Spacewatch || 
|- id="1997 SR26" bgcolor=#E9E9E9
| 0 ||  || MBA-M || 17.58 || data-sort-value="0.91" | 910 m || multiple || 1997–2021 || 23 May 2021 || 84 || align=left | Disc.: SpacewatchAlt.: 2008 EO90 || 
|- id="1997 SB28" bgcolor=#E9E9E9
| 0 ||  || MBA-M || 18.0 || 1.1 km || multiple || 1997–2019 || 27 Nov 2019 || 83 || align=left | Disc.: SpacewatchAlt.: 2015 XF307 || 
|- id="1997 SX28" bgcolor=#E9E9E9
| 0 ||  || MBA-M || 17.9 || 1.1 km || multiple || 1997–2021 || 12 Feb 2021 || 69 || align=left | Disc.: SpacewatchAlt.: 2019 NW22 || 
|- id="1997 SN29" bgcolor=#fefefe
| 0 ||  || MBA-I || 19.1 || data-sort-value="0.52" | 460 m || multiple || 1997–2022 || 01 Aug 2022 || 52 || align=left | Disc.: SpacewatchAlt.: 2015 OW28 || 
|- id="1997 SC32" bgcolor=#E9E9E9
| 0 ||  || MBA-M || 17.72 || data-sort-value="0.85" | 850 m || multiple || 1997–2021 || 02 May 2021 || 114 || align=left | Disc.: Bergisch GladbachAlt.: 2018 RD34 || 
|- id="1997 SS32" bgcolor=#d6d6d6
| 0 ||  || MBA-O || 17.02 || 2.2 km || multiple || 1997–2021 || 28 Nov 2021 || 68 || align=left | Disc.: Spacewatch || 
|- id="1997 SV32" bgcolor=#fefefe
| 1 ||  || MBA-I || 19.23 || data-sort-value="0.42" | 420 m || multiple || 1997–2021 || 08 Dec 2021 || 44 || align=left | Disc.: SpacewatchAlt.: 2014 TN38 || 
|- id="1997 SX35" bgcolor=#E9E9E9
| 0 ||  || MBA-M || 17.70 || data-sort-value="0.86" | 860 m || multiple || 1997–2021 || 04 Oct 2021 || 123 || align=left | Disc.: Spacewatch || 
|- id="1997 SZ35" bgcolor=#d6d6d6
| 0 ||  || MBA-O || 17.06 || 2.2 km || multiple || 1997–2021 || 14 Jul 2021 || 106 || align=left | Disc.: Spacewatch || 
|}
back to top

T 

|- id="1997 TN" bgcolor=#d6d6d6
| E || 1997 TN || MBA-O || — || — || single || 2 days || 04 Oct 1997 || 18 || align=left | Disc.: Mauna Kea Obs. || 
|- id="1997 TQ" bgcolor=#d6d6d6
| 9 || 1997 TQ || MBA-O || 99.99 || data-sort-value="0.000000000000000056" | 0 m || single || 1 day || 03 Oct 1997 || 11 || align=left | Disc.: Mauna Kea Obs.Added on 21 August 2021 || 
|- id="1997 TD3" bgcolor=#E9E9E9
| 0 ||  || MBA-M || 17.24 || 2.0 km || multiple || 1997–2022 || 25 Jan 2022 || 72 || align=left | Disc.: ODASAlt.: 2011 VJ9 || 
|- id="1997 TF6" bgcolor=#fefefe
| 0 ||  || MBA-I || 18.0 || data-sort-value="0.75" | 750 m || multiple || 1997–2021 || 03 Dec 2021 || 140 || align=left | Disc.: ODASAlt.: 2009 BC90 || 
|- id="1997 TC8" bgcolor=#d6d6d6
| 0 ||  || MBA-O || 17.0 || 2.2 km || multiple || 1997–2020 || 25 Jan 2020 || 37 || align=left | Disc.: Spacewatch || 
|- id="1997 TL8" bgcolor=#fefefe
| 0 ||  || MBA-I || 18.75 || data-sort-value="0.53" | 530 m || multiple || 1997–2021 || 09 Oct 2021 || 64 || align=left | Disc.: SpacewatchAlt.: 2014 RW32 || 
|- id="1997 TX8" bgcolor=#C2E0FF
| E ||  || TNO || 8.5 || 94 km || single || 24 days || 29 Oct 1997 || 12 || align=left | Disc.: Palomar Obs.LoUTNOs, plutino? || 
|- id="1997 TW11" bgcolor=#d6d6d6
| 0 ||  || MBA-O || 16.34 || 3.0 km || multiple || 1997–2022 || 08 Jan 2022 || 287 || align=left | Disc.: Xinglong Stn.Alt.: 2014 SC239 || 
|- id="1997 TU12" bgcolor=#E9E9E9
| 0 ||  || MBA-M || 18.28 || data-sort-value="0.68" | 680 m || multiple || 1997–2022 || 24 Dec 2022 || 62 || align=left | Disc.: Spacewatch || 
|- id="1997 TO15" bgcolor=#FA8072
| 0 ||  || MCA || 18.7 || data-sort-value="0.54" | 540 m || multiple || 1997–2019 || 07 Apr 2019 || 55 || align=left | Disc.: SpacewatchAlt.: 2010 TN181 || 
|- id="1997 TZ16" bgcolor=#FFC2E0
| 7 ||  || APO || 24.5 || data-sort-value="0.045" | 45 m || single || 3 days || 12 Oct 1997 || 27 || align=left | Disc.: Spacewatch || 
|- id="1997 TD20" bgcolor=#E9E9E9
| 0 ||  || MBA-M || 17.76 || 1.6 km || multiple || 1997–2022 || 27 Jan 2022 || 58 || align=left | Disc.: SpacewatchAdded on 19 October 2020Alt.: 2011 SY230 || 
|- id="1997 TA23" bgcolor=#E9E9E9
| 0 ||  || MBA-M || 18.09 || 1.0 km || multiple || 1997–2021 || 14 Apr 2021 || 93 || align=left | Disc.: SpacewatchAlt.: 2010 TT60 || 
|- id="1997 TO23" bgcolor=#E9E9E9
| 0 ||  || MBA-M || 17.29 || 1.0 km || multiple || 1997–2021 || 06 Aug 2021 || 104 || align=left | Disc.: SpacewatchAlt.: 2008 HR71 || 
|- id="1997 TV23" bgcolor=#fefefe
| 0 ||  = (619163) || MBA-I || 18.0 || data-sort-value="0.75" | 750 m || multiple || 1997–2020 || 31 Jan 2020 || 64 || align=left | Disc.: Spacewatch || 
|- id="1997 TC25" bgcolor=#FFC2E0
| 7 ||  || APO || 24.6 || data-sort-value="0.043" | 43 m || single || 23 days || 23 Oct 1997 || 17 || align=left | Disc.: Spacewatch || 
|- id="1997 TT25" bgcolor=#FFC2E0
| 1 ||  || AMO || 19.3 || data-sort-value="0.49" | 490 m || multiple || 1997–2020 || 05 Mar 2020 || 168 || align=left | Disc.: Xinglong Stn. || 
|- id="1997 TS30" bgcolor=#fefefe
| 0 ||  || MBA-I || 19.0 || data-sort-value="0.49" | 490 m || multiple || 1997–2022 || 29 Aug 2022 || 36 || align=left | Disc.: Spacewatch || 
|}
back to top

U 

|- id="1997 UR" bgcolor=#FFC2E0
| 6 || 1997 UR || APO || 23.2 || data-sort-value="0.081" | 81 m || single || 21 days || 12 Nov 1997 || 143 || align=left | Disc.: LINEARAMO at MPC || 
|- id="1997 UK6" bgcolor=#d6d6d6
| 0 ||  || MBA-O || 17.30 || 1.9 km || multiple || 1997–2021 || 27 Oct 2021 || 107 || align=left | Disc.: Spacewatch || 
|- id="1997 UE7" bgcolor=#d6d6d6
| 0 ||  || MBA-O || 16.8 || 2.4 km || multiple || 1997–2021 || 08 Sep 2021 || 58 || align=left | Disc.: Mauna Kea Obs.Added on 29 January 2022 || 
|- id="1997 UT9" bgcolor=#FA8072
| 2 ||  || MCA || 19.5 || data-sort-value="0.37" | 370 m || multiple || 1997–2021 || 06 Jan 2021 || 119 || align=left | Disc.: NEAT/GEODSSAlt.: 2010 TT19 || 
|- id="1997 UZ10" bgcolor=#FFC2E0
| 8 ||  || AMO || 23.0 || data-sort-value="0.089" | 89 m || single || 14 days || 12 Nov 1997 || 36 || align=left | Disc.: LINEAR || 
|- id="1997 UA11" bgcolor=#FFC2E0
| 3 ||  || APO || 25.2 || data-sort-value="0.032" | 32 m || single || 13 days || 08 Nov 1997 || 29 || align=left | Disc.: LINEAR || 
|- id="1997 US11" bgcolor=#fefefe
| 0 ||  || MBA-I || 18.65 || data-sort-value="0.55" | 550 m || multiple || 1997–2020 || 19 Jan 2020 || 35 || align=left | Disc.: SpacewatchAdded on 21 August 2021Alt.: 2015 UK69 || 
|- id="1997 UL13" bgcolor=#d6d6d6
| 0 ||  || MBA-O || 16.79 || 2.4 km || multiple || 1992–2021 || 02 May 2021 || 86 || align=left | Disc.: Spacewatch || 
|- id="1997 UN13" bgcolor=#fefefe
| 0 ||  || MBA-I || 18.02 || data-sort-value="0.74" | 740 m || multiple || 1997–2021 || 27 Nov 2021 || 117 || align=left | Disc.: Spacewatch || 
|- id="1997 UR14" bgcolor=#d6d6d6
| 1 ||  || MBA-O || 16.95 || 2.3 km || multiple || 1997–2023 || 18 Mar 2023 || 28 || align=left | Disc.: SpacewatchAlt.: 2014 WP303 || 
|- id="1997 UV15" bgcolor=#fefefe
| 0 ||  || MBA-I || 18.17 || data-sort-value="0.69" | 690 m || multiple || 1997–2021 || 30 Nov 2021 || 120 || align=left | Disc.: SpacewatchAlt.: 2014 WA246 || 
|- id="1997 UX15" bgcolor=#E9E9E9
| 0 ||  || MBA-M || 17.6 || 1.7 km || multiple || 1997–2020 || 17 Dec 2020 || 48 || align=left | Disc.: Spacewatch || 
|- id="1997 UM16" bgcolor=#d6d6d6
| 0 ||  || MBA-O || 17.2 || 2.0 km || multiple || 1997–2019 || 03 Dec 2019 || 54 || align=left | Disc.: Spacewatch || 
|- id="1997 UX18" bgcolor=#fefefe
| 0 ||  || MBA-I || 18.02 || data-sort-value="0.74" | 740 m || multiple || 1997–2022 || 26 Jan 2022 || 149 || align=left | Disc.: Spacewatch || 
|- id="1997 UR19" bgcolor=#E9E9E9
| 1 ||  || MBA-M || 18.5 || data-sort-value="0.84" | 840 m || multiple || 1997–2018 || 04 Oct 2018 || 26 || align=left | Disc.: Spacewatch || 
|- id="1997 UA20" bgcolor=#fefefe
| 0 ||  || MBA-I || 17.51 || data-sort-value="0.94" | 940 m || multiple || 1997–2021 || 11 May 2021 || 130 || align=left | Disc.: Spacewatch || 
|- id="1997 UF23" bgcolor=#d6d6d6
| 0 ||  || MBA-O || 16.65 || 2.6 km || multiple || 1997–2021 || 14 May 2021 || 119 || align=left | Disc.: Anderson Mesa || 
|- id="1997 UG25" bgcolor=#C2E0FF
| E ||  || TNO || 8.5 || 68 km || single || 1 day || 27 Oct 1997 || 4 || align=left | Disc.: La Palma Obs.LoUTNOs, cubewano? || 
|}
back to top

V 

|- id="1997 VG" bgcolor=#FFC2E0
| 8 || 1997 VG || AMO || 22.2 || data-sort-value="0.13" | 130 m || single || 10 days || 09 Nov 1997 || 74 || align=left | Disc.: LINEAR || 
|- id="1997 VN4" bgcolor=#FFC2E0
| 2 ||  || AMO || 23.3 || data-sort-value="0.078" | 78 m || multiple || 1997–2016 || 08 Nov 2016 || 140 || align=left | Disc.: LINEAR || 
|- id="1997 VG6" bgcolor=#FFC2E0
| 8 ||  || APO || 19.6 || data-sort-value="0.43" | 430 m || single || 15 days || 23 Nov 1997 || 50 || align=left | Disc.: LINEARPotentially hazardous object || 
|- id="1997 VS9" bgcolor=#d6d6d6
| 0 ||  || MBA-O || 17.3 || 1.9 km || multiple || 1997–2018 || 14 Sep 2018 || 53 || align=left | Disc.: Spacewatch || 
|- id="1997 VU9" bgcolor=#d6d6d6
| 0 ||  || MBA-O || 17.75 || 1.6 km || multiple || 1997–2021 || 24 Nov 2021 || 60 || align=left | Disc.: SpacewatchAdded on 24 December 2021 || 
|}
back to top

W 

|- id="1997 WC6" bgcolor=#d6d6d6
| 0 ||  || MBA-O || 16.8 || 2.4 km || multiple || 1997–2019 || 20 Dec 2019 || 59 || align=left | Disc.: Spacewatch || 
|- id="1997 WJ6" bgcolor=#d6d6d6
| 0 ||  || MBA-O || 17.25 || 2.0 km || multiple || 1997–2021 || 02 Oct 2021 || 77 || align=left | Disc.: SpacewatchAdded on 22 July 2020 || 
|- id="1997 WT6" bgcolor=#d6d6d6
| – ||  || MBA-O || 17.0 || 2.2 km || single || 7 days || 30 Nov 1997 || 9 || align=left | Disc.: Spacewatch || 
|- id="1997 WK10" bgcolor=#d6d6d6
| 0 ||  || MBA-O || 16.72 || 2.5 km || multiple || 1997–2021 || 27 Oct 2021 || 125 || align=left | Disc.: Spacewatch || 
|- id="1997 WP13" bgcolor=#E9E9E9
| 0 ||  || MBA-M || 17.2 || 2.0 km || multiple || 1997–2021 || 06 Jan 2021 || 102 || align=left | Disc.: SpacewatchAlt.: 2011 WX71, 2015 PG53 || 
|- id="1997 WE14" bgcolor=#E9E9E9
| 1 ||  || MBA-M || 17.6 || 1.3 km || multiple || 1997–2020 || 19 Apr 2020 || 29 || align=left | Disc.: Spacewatch || 
|- id="1997 WS15" bgcolor=#fefefe
| 0 ||  || MBA-I || 18.1 || data-sort-value="0.71" | 710 m || multiple || 1997–2021 || 18 Jan 2021 || 71 || align=left | Disc.: SpacewatchAlt.: 2008 SS18 || 
|- id="1997 WX15" bgcolor=#d6d6d6
| 0 ||  || MBA-O || 17.54 || 1.7 km || multiple || 1997–2021 || 06 Nov 2021 || 48 || align=left | Disc.: SpacewatchAdded on 5 November 2021Alt.: 2007 VS169 || 
|- id="1997 WO19" bgcolor=#E9E9E9
| 0 ||  || MBA-M || 17.80 || 1.2 km || multiple || 1997–2021 || 09 Apr 2021 || 68 || align=left | Disc.: SpacewatchAlt.: 2015 XO369 || 
|- id="1997 WQ23" bgcolor=#FFC2E0
| 1 ||  || APO || 20.8 || data-sort-value="0.25" | 250 m || multiple || 1997–2020 || 18 Dec 2020 || 185 || align=left | Disc.: LINEARPotentially hazardous object || 
|- id="1997 WJ29" bgcolor=#E9E9E9
| 0 ||  || MBA-M || 17.79 || data-sort-value="0.82" | 820 m || multiple || 1997–2021 || 11 Jun 2021 || 62 || align=left | Disc.: Spacewatch || 
|- id="1997 WX58" bgcolor=#d6d6d6
| 0 ||  || MBA-O || 16.53 || 2.8 km || multiple || 1997–2021 || 09 Dec 2021 || 120 || align=left | Disc.: Spacewatch || 
|}
back to top

X 

|- id="1997 XS2" bgcolor=#FFC2E0
| 1 ||  || AMO || 19.4 || data-sort-value="0.47" | 470 m || multiple || 1997–2011 || 11 Jan 2011 || 116 || align=left | Disc.: LINEAR || 
|- id="1997 XE10" bgcolor=#FFC2E0
| 0 ||  || APO || 24.53 || data-sort-value="0.044" | 44 m || multiple || 1997–2021 || 02 Jan 2021 || 68 || align=left | Disc.: LINEAR || 
|- id="1997 XR14" bgcolor=#d6d6d6
| 0 ||  || MBA-O || 16.7 || 2.5 km || multiple || 1997–2020 || 23 Nov 2020 || 59 || align=left | Disc.: Spacewatch || 
|}
back to top

Y 

|- id="1997 YM9" bgcolor=#FFC2E0
| 0 ||  || APO || 24.36 || data-sort-value="0.048" | 48 m || multiple || 1997–2021 || 09 Sep 2021 || 70 || align=left | Disc.: NEAT/GEODSSAlt.: 2005 YM128 || 
|- id="1997 YR10" bgcolor=#FFC2E0
| 8 ||  || AMO || 20.1 || data-sort-value="0.34" | 340 m || single || 6 days || 03 Jan 1998 || 34 || align=left | Disc.: NEAT/GEODSS || 
|- id="1997 YM15" bgcolor=#d6d6d6
| 0 ||  || MBA-O || 16.03 || 3.5 km || multiple || 1997–2021 || 07 Apr 2021 || 398 || align=left | Disc.: SpacewatchAlt.: 2010 KR56 || 
|}
back to top

References 
 

Lists of unnumbered minor planets